Requiem Canticles can refer to: 

Requiem Canticles, a composition by Igor Stravinsky, 1966
Requiem Canticles (Balanchine), a ballet by George Balanchine, 1968
Requiem Canticles (Robbins), a ballet by Jerome Robbins, 1972

See also
Requiem (disambiguation)